February 16 - Eastern Orthodox liturgical calendar - February 18

All fixed commemorations below are observed on March 2  (March 1 on leap years) by Eastern Orthodox Churches on the Old Calendar.

For February 17th, Orthodox Churches on the Old Calendar commemorate the Saints listed on February 4.

Saints

 Saint Mariamne, Equal to the Apostles, sister of Apostle Philip (1st century)
 Saint Auxibius of Soli, Bishop of Soli in Cyprus (102)
 Martyrs Donatus, Romulus, Secundian, and 86 Companions, at Concordia (Portogruaro), near Venice (304) 
 Great-martyr Theodore the Tyro (c. 306)
 Martyr Theodoulos, at Caesarea Palestina (308) 
 Saint Mesrop Mashtots of Armenia (440)
 Holy Emperor Marcian (457) and St. Pulcheria, his wife (453)
 Venerable Martyr Theocteristus, Abbot of Pelekete monastery near Prusa (8th century)  (see also: November 10 and February 28)

Pre-Schism Western saints

 Martyrs Faustinus and Companions, a group of forty-five martyrs honoured in Rome. 
 Saint Lommán of Trim (Luman), a nephew of St Patrick and the first Bishop of Trim in Meath in Ireland (c. 450)
 Saint Habet-Deus, Bishop of Luna in Tuscany in Italy, probably martyred by the Arian Vandals (c. 500)
 Saint Fortchern, Bishop of Trim in Ireland, he later lived as a hermit (6th century)
 Saint Guevrock (Gueroc; Kerric), Abbot of Loc-Kirec, he also helped St Paul of Léon (6th century) 
 Saint Fintan of Clonenagh, a disciple of St Columba, he led the life of a hermit in Clonenagh in Leix in Ireland, Confessor (603) 
 Saint Finan of Lindisfarne, Bishop of Lindisfarne (661) 
 Saint Silvinus of Auchy, enlightener of the area near Thérouanne, then a monastic in the Benedictine abbey of Auchy-les-Moines (fr) (c. 718)

Post-Schism Orthodox saints

 St. Euxiphius I, Bishop and Wonderworker, listed in some synaxaria as one of the "300 Allemagne Saints" in Cyprus (late 12th century) (see also: September 17)
 Venerable Theodore the Silent, of the Kiev Caves Monastery (13th century)
 Venerable Theodosius, monastic founder at Mt. Kelifarevo (1363), and his disciple St. Romanus (c. 1370), of Turnovo, Bulgaria.
 New Martyr Michael Mavroeidis of Adrianopolis (1490)
 Saint Hermogenes of Moscow, Patriarch and Wonderworker of Moscow and all Russia (1612)
 New Martyr Theodore of Byzantium, at Mytilene (1795)
 New Hieromartyr Theodore of Adjara, Hieromonk, at Mt. Athos (1822) 
 Venerable Barnabas, Elder of Gethsemane Skete, of St. Sergius Lavra (1906)
 Saint Nicholas Planas, Priest, of Athens (1932) (see also: March 2 - Greek)
 New Hieromartyr Joseph Zograph of Dionysiou, Hieromonk, at Mt. Athos (1819)

New martyrs and confessors

 New Hieromartyr Paul Kosminkov, Archpriest, of Lystsevo, Moscow (1938)
 New Hieromartyr Michael Nikologorsky, Priest (1938)
 Martyr Anna Chetverikov (1940) (see also: February 18)

Other commemorations

 Uncovering of the relics (867-869) of Martyr Menas the Most Eloquent, of Alexandria (ca. 313)
 Weeping "Tikhvin" Icon of the Most Holy Theotokos, at the Kozak Skete of St. Elias on Mt. Athos.
 Repose of Elder Agapitus of the Kiev Caves (1887)
 Repose of Schemamonk John (Shova) of Kolitsou Skete, Mt. Athos (2009)

Icon gallery

Notes

References

Sources
 February 17 / March 2. Orthodox Calendar (pravoslavie.ru).
 March 2 / February 17. Holy Trinity Russian Orthodox Church (A parish of the Patriarchate of Moscow).
 February 17. OCA - The Lives of the Saints.
 The Autonomous Orthodox Metropolia of Western Europe and the Americas. St. Hilarion Calendar of Saints for the year of our Lord 2004. St. Hilarion Press (Austin, TX). pp. 15-16.
 The Seventeenth Day of the Month of February. Orthodoxy in China.
 February 17. Latin Saints of the Orthodox Patriarchate of Rome.
 The Roman Martyrology. Transl. by the Archbishop of Baltimore. Last Edition, According to the Copy Printed at Rome in 1914. Revised Edition, with the Imprimatur of His Eminence Cardinal Gibbons. Baltimore: John Murphy Company, 1916. pp. 50-51.
 Rev. Richard Stanton. A Menology of England and Wales, or, Brief Memorials of the Ancient British and English Saints Arranged According to the Calendar, Together with the Martyrs of the 16th and 17th Centuries. London: Burns & Oates, 1892. pp. 72-74.
Greek Sources
 Great Synaxaristes:  17 Φεβρουαρίου. Μεγασ Συναξαριστησ.
  Συναξαριστής. 17 Φεβρουαρίου. ecclesia.gr. (H Εκκλησια Τησ Ελλαδοσ). 
Russian Sources
  2 марта (17 февраля). Православная Энциклопедия под редакцией Патриарха Московского и всея Руси Кирилла (электронная версия). (Orthodox Encyclopedia - Pravenc.ru).
  17 февраля (ст.ст.) 2 марта 2014 (нов. ст.). Русская Православная Церковь Отдел внешних церковных связей.

February in the Eastern Orthodox calendar